UNRA or Unra may refer to:

 Uganda National Roads Authority, a Uganda government parastatal
 United Nations Relief and Rehabilitation Administration, an agency of the United Nations